Paradeudorix boormani, the Boorman's fairy playboy, is a butterfly in the family Lycaenidae. It is found in Nigeria. The habitat consists of primary forests.

References

Endemic fauna of Nigeria
Butterflies described in 1996
Deudorigini